Women in Science Hall of Fame was established in 2010 by the U.S. State Department Environment, Science, Technology, and Health Hub for the Middle East and North Africa to recognize the exceptional women scientists in this region of the world.

Annual awards were made 2011-2015 and coordinated by the U.S. Embassy in Amman, Jordan.

References

Women's halls of fame
United States Department of State
Awards established in 2010
2010 establishments in Jordan
Science and technology halls of fame
Awards disestablished in 2016
Jordan–United States relations
Halls of fame in Jordan
Women in Jordan
Women in science and technology